Men's Slalom competition at the 2009 World Championships was run on February 15, the final race of the championships.

Results

Men's slalom